The Macedonian Orthodox Church – Archdiocese of Ohrid (MOC-AO), or simply the Macedonian Orthodox Church (MOC) or the Archdiocese of Ohrid (AO), is an autocephalous Eastern Orthodox church in North Macedonia. The Macedonian Orthodox Church claims ecclesiastical jurisdiction over North Macedonia, and is also represented in the Macedonian diaspora. The primate of the Macedonian Orthodox Church is Stefan Veljanovski, the Metropolitan of Skopje and Archbishop of Ohrid and Macedonia.

In 1959, the Holy Synod of the Serbian Orthodox Church granted autonomy to the Macedonian Orthodox Church in the then-Socialist Republic of Macedonia, as the restoration of the historic Archbishopric of Ohrid; the MOC was united with the Serbian Orthodox Church (SOC) as a part of the SOC. In 1967, on the bicentennial anniversary of the abolition of the Archbishopric of Ohrid, the Macedonian Holy Synod unilaterally announced its autocephaly from the Serbian Orthodox Church. The Serbian synod denounced the decision and condemned the clergy as schismatic. Thenceforth, the Macedonian Church had remained unrecognized by all mainstream Eastern Orthodox churches for 55 years.

The Macedonian Orthodox Church was formally reintegrated into the mainstream Eastern Orthodox community in 2022. On 9 May 2022, the Ecumenical Patriarchate accepted the MOC into communion and recognized North Macedonia as its canonical territory. On 16 May of the same year, the schism between the Serbian and Macedonian churches ended, with the Serbian church stating the MOC was restored as an autonomous part of the Serbian church according to its 1959 status. On 24 May, the SOC announced it recognised the autocephaly of the MOC. In June 2022, the Serbian Orthodox Church officially granted autocephaly to the MOC, and the Ecumenical Patriarchate officially recognized the MOC as a legitimate autocephalous church. On 22 June, the Bulgarian Orthodox Church restored communion with the MOC.

History

Background 

Following the fall of the First Bulgarian Empire, Byzantine Emperor Basil II acknowledged the autocephalous status of the Bulgarian Orthodox Church and set up its boundaries, dioceses, property and other privileges. The Archbishopric was seated in Ohrid in the Byzantine theme of Bulgaria and was established in 1019 by lowering the rank of the autocephalous Bulgarian Patriarchate and its subjugation to the jurisdiction of the Patriarchate of Constantinople.

In 1767 the Ohrid Archbishopric was abolished by the Ottoman authorities and annexed to the Ecumenical Patriarchate of Constantinople. During the Bulgarian National awakening, efforts were made in Ottoman Macedonia for the restoration of a Bulgarian church in the region separate from the Greek Patriarchate, and in 1870 the Bulgarian Exarchate was created. The Christian population of the bishoprics of Skopje and Ohrid voted in 1874 overwhelmingly in favour of joining the exarchate, and the Bulgarian Exarchate became in control of most of the Macedonian region. There were also unsuccessful attempts made by some to specifically restore the Ohrid Archbishopric itself, most notably by Theodosius of Skopje.

Following Vardar Macedonia's incorporation into Serbia in 1913, several of the Bulgarian Exarchate's dioceses were forcefully taken over by the Serbian Orthodox Church. While the region was occupied by Bulgaria during World War I and World War II, the local dioceses temporarily came under the control of the Bulgarian Exarchate.

The first modern assembly of Macedonian clergy was held in the village of Izdeglavje near Ohrid in 1943. In October 1944, an initiative board for the organization of the Macedonian Orthodox Church was officially formed. In 1945, the first clergy and people's synod met and adopted a resolution for the restoration of the Ohrid Archbishopric as a Macedonian Orthodox Church. It was submitted to the Serbian Orthodox Church, which since 1919 had been the sole church in Vardar Macedonia. The resolution was rejected, but a later one, submitted in 1958 at the second synod, was accepted on June 17, 1959, by the Serbian Orthodox Church under pressure from the Socialist authorities. Dimitrija Stojkovski, a Macedonian, was appointed the first archbishop of Ohrid and Metropolitan of Macedonia under the name Dositheus II.

Self-proclaimed autocephaly 

At its third synod in 1967, on the bicentennial anniversary of the abolition of the Archbishopric of Ohrid, the Macedonian Church proclaimed its autocephaly (full administrative independence). Serbian Church bishops denounced the decision and condemned the clergy as schismatic. For all the subsequent efforts to gain recognition, the autocephaly of the Macedonian Church was not recognized by other canonical Eastern Orthodox churches, due to opposition from the SOC.

Since the breakup of Yugoslavia (the 1990s), the Serbian Patriarchate had sought to restore its control over the Macedonian Church.

The later chain of events turned into a vicious circle of mutual accusations and incidents involving the Serbian Orthodox Church and, partly, the Serbian government on one side, and the MOC, backed by the Macedonian government on the other. The Macedonian side regarded Jovan as a traitor and Serbian puppet. Jovan complained of a new state-backed media campaign against his church. The government has denied registration to his organisation, and launched a criminal case against him. He was arrested, removed from his bishopric and then expelled from the country and later sentenced to 18 months in prison and jailed with "extremely limited visitation rights".

In turn, the Serbian Church denied a Macedonian delegation access to the monastery of Prohor Pčinjski, which was the usual site of Macedonian celebration of the national holiday of Ilinden (literally meaning St. Elijah Day) on August 2 and the site where the First Session of ASNOM was held. Macedonian border police often denied Serbian priests entry into the country in clerical garb.

On 12 November 2009, the Macedonian Orthodox Church added "Archdiocese of Ohrid" to its official name and changed its coat of arms and flag. This name change was a way for the MOC to proclaim itself as the successor of the Archbishopric of Ohrid.

Recognition efforts 

In November 2017, Bulgarian National Television announced the content of a letter that the MOC had sent to the Holy Synod of the Bulgarian Orthodox Church requesting talks on recognition of the Macedonian Orthodox Church. The letter was signed by Archbishop Stefan Veljanovski. Among other things, the letter stated: "The Bulgarian Orthodox Church - Bulgarian Patriarchate, taking into account the unity of the Orthodox Church and the real spiritual and pastoral needs, should establish eucharistic unity with the restored Ohrid Archbishopric in the face of the Macedonian Orthodox Church". 27 November, the Holy Synod of the Bulgarian patriarchate accepted the proposal that it become Macedonia's mother church and agreed to work towards recognition of its status. The Serbian Church expressed its surprise over the Bulgarian decision to be “mother” to the Macedonian Church.

On May 14, 2018, the Bulgarian Orthodox Church decided to decline the invitation from the Macedonian Orthodox Church to participate in the festivities celebrating the 1000th anniversary of the establishment of the Archbishopric of Ohrid. They also declined to send a representative to the celebration.

In late May 2018, the Ecumenical Patriarchate of Constantinople announced it had accepted the request from Skopje to examine the canonical status of the Ohrid Archbishopric.

On 13 January 2020, the Ecumenical Patriarch Bartholomew received North Macedonia's prime minister Oliver Spasovski and his predecessor Zoran Zaev. According to the Ecumenical Patriarchate's statement, "The purpose of the visit was to examine the ecclesiastical problem of the country. The previous stages of the matter were discussed during the meeting." It was announced that the patriarch would invite both the Serbian Orthodox Church and the Macedonian Orthodox Church to a joint meeting in a bid to find a mutually acceptable solution to the country's ecclesiastical issue. In September 2020, the President of North Macedonia, Stevo Pendarovski, wrote a letter asking the Ecumenical Patriarch, asking him to recognise the MOC.

Communion with mainstream Eastern Orthodoxy 
On 9 May 2022, the Holy Synod of the Ecumenical Patriarchate stated it recognised the Macedonian Orthodox Church, its hierarchy and faithful, and established eucharistic communion with it. It also stated that it recognised the MOC's jurisdiction as being over North Macedonia. However, the Ecumenical Patriarchate explicitly refused to recognise the word "Macedonia" or any other derivative to designate the church, and stated it would use "Ohrid" to refer to it. The Holy Synod also stated it was the role of the Serbian Orthodox Church to settle the administrative issues the Serbian Church had with the MOC. The decision of the Ecumenical Patriarchate was welcomed by North Macedonia's Prime Minister, Dimitar Kovačevski. After the Ecumenical Patriarchate announced communion with the MOC, the Russian Orthodox Church came to the conclusion that it recognizes only the canonical rights of the Serbian Orthodox Church and refuses to recognize the MOC's jurisdiction over North Macedonia.

On 16 May, the Holy Synod of the Serbian Orthodox Church released a statement that the situation of the MOC was resolved. The Holy Synod stated that full ecclesiastical autonomy was restored to the MOC under the Patriarchate of Serbia, bringing the MOC-OA fully into communion with the mainstream Eastern Orthodox world.

Recognized autocephaly 
On 24 May 2022, the feast of saints Cyril and Methodius, during a liturgy presided by both primates of the MOC-OA and the Serbian Orthodox Church in Skopje, Patriarch Porfirije of the Serbian Church announced to the faithful that "the Holy Synod of the Serbian Orthodox Church has unanimously met the pleas of the Macedonian Orthodox Church and has accepted and recognized its autocephaly." During this liturgy, the primate of the MOC-OA stated he considered the Mother Church of the MOC to be the Ecumenical Patriarchate.

On 5 June 2022, during a concelebration of the Divine Liturgy in Belgrade between the SOC and the MOC, Patriarch Porfirije of Serbia gave a tomos of autocephaly to Archbishop Stefan.

On the same day, Archbishop Stefan stated that he only recognised autocephaly that is granted from the Ecumenical Patriarchate, in accordance, he stated, with canon law. The formal statement from the MOC released the following day explained that it viewed the document it had received from the SOC as a mere "recommendation [...] of autocephaly".

On 10 June 2022, on a visit to Istanbul, Archbishop Stefan was handed the Patriarchal and Synodal Act confirming the canonical and liturgical unity with the Church of Constantinople. On 12 June, the Ecumenical Patriarch Bartholomew and Archbishop Stefan concelebrated the Divine Liturgy at the Church of St. George in the Phanar. Present at this liturgy was a delegation of the Government of North Macedonia: the prime minister of North Macedonia, Dimitar Kovačevski, the Minister of Foreign Affairs, Bujar Osmani, the Minister of Defence, Slavjanka Petrovska, and the Minister of Internal Affairs, Oliver Spasovski; also present was a delegation of the Interparliamentary Assembly on Orthodoxy led by its General Secretary Maximos Charakopoulos. After this liturgy, Kovačevski was received by the Ecumenical Patriarch in a private audience; Kovačevski thanked the Ecumenical Patriarch for his decision of recognizing the MOC, and stated the Patriarch had corrected a historical injustice by doing so.

On 22 June 2022, the Bulgarian Orthodox Church established communion with the MOC. On 25 August 2022, the Russian Orthodox Church established communion with the MOC. The church's autocephaly was recognized by the Romanian Orthodox Church on 9 February 2023.

Organization

Dioceses on the territory of North Macedonia 
Diocese of Skopje, headed by Archbishop Stefan of Ohrid and Macedonia;
Diocese of Tetovo and Gostivar, headed by Metropolitan Joseph;
Diocese of Kumanovo and Osogovo, headed by Metropolitan Joseph;
Diocese of Debar and Kičevo, headed by Metropolitan Timothy;
Diocese of Prespa and Pelagonia, headed by Metropolitan Peter;
Diocese of Strumica, headed by Metropolitan Naum;
Diocese of Bregalnica, headed by Metropolitan Hilarion;
Diocese of Povardarie, headed by Metropolitan Agathangel

Diaspora dioceses 
American-Canadian Diocese, headed by Metropolitan Methodius
European Diocese, headed by Metropolitan Pimen
Diocese of Australia and New Zealand, administered by Metropolitan Peter of Prespa and Pelagonia, headquarters in Melbourne.
Diocese of Australia and Sydney, administered by Metropolitan Timothy of Debar and Kičevo, headquarters in Sydney.

Outside the country, the church is active in 4 dioceses in the Macedonian diaspora. The 12 dioceses of the church are governed by ten Episcopes, with around 500 active priests in about 500 parishes with over 2000 churches and monasteries. The church claims jurisdiction of about twenty living monasteries, with more than 100 monks.

Note

See also

List of churches in North Macedonia
Macedonian Greek Catholic Church
Premin

References

Further reading 

 Article on the MOC by Ronald Roberson on the CNEWA website

External links

 
National churches
1967 establishments in the Socialist Republic of Macedonia
Christian organizations established in 1967
Eastern Orthodox organizations established in the 20th century
Religious organizations based in North Macedonia